Associação Desportiva Senador Guiomard, commonly known as ADESG, is a Brazilian association football club based in Senador Guiomard, Acre. The club currently doesn't play in any league, having last participated in the Campeonato Acreano Segunda Divisão in the 2017 season.

The team's home kit is a black and white vertical striped shirt, black shorts and black socks. ADESG's mascot is a lion and they play their home games at the Estádio Naborzão which has a capacity of 2,000.

History
Associação Desportiva Senador Guiomard was founded on January 26, 1982. The club won the Campeonato Acriano in 2006, after winning both stages of the competition.

Honours

Domestic

State 

 Campeonato Acreano:

 Winners (1): 2006
 Runners-up (2): 1993, 2005

 Campeonato Acreano Segunda Divisão:

 Winners (1): 2017
 Runners-up (2): 2015, 2016

Current squad

First Team

References

External links
 Associação Desportiva Senador Guiomard at Arquivo de Clubes

Association football clubs established in 1982
Football clubs in Acre (state)
1982 establishments in Brazil